Chrysoma is a genus of flowering plants in the family Asteraceae.

Species
More than 20 species names have been created in the genus, most of them now transferred to other genera (Ericameria, Xylothamia, Solidago, Gundlachia). Only one remains, Chrysoma pauciflosculosa, native to the southeastern United States (Florida, Georgia, Alabama, Mississippi, South Carolina, North Carolina). Flower heads are yellow, in dense, flat-topped arrays of many small heads, sometimes with no ray florets but sometimes with 2 or 3 ray florets, plus 2-5 disc florets.

References

External links
Floridata Plant Encyclopedia
Native Florida Wildflowers
Carolina Nature
Discover Life

Monotypic Asteraceae genera
Astereae
Flora of the Southeastern United States